Sir George James Frampton,  (18 June 1860 – 21 May 1928) was a British sculptor. He was a leading member of the New Sculpture movement in his early career when he created sculptures with elements of Art Nouveau and Symbolism, often combining different materials such as marble and bronze in a single piece. While his later works were more traditional in style, Frampton had a prolific career in which he created many notable public monuments, including several statues of Queen Victoria and later, after World War I, a number of war memorials. These included the Edith Cavell Memorial in London, which, along with the Peter Pan statue in Kensington Gardens are possibly Frampton's best known works.

Biography

Early life
Frampton was born on 18 June 1860 in London, where his father was a woodcarver and stonemason. George Frampton began his own working life as a stone carver in 1878, working on the Hôtel de Ville in Paris. Frampton returned to London to study under William Silver Frith at the South London Technical School of Art during 1880 and 1881. He went on to the Royal Academy Schools where, between 1881 and 1887, he won a gold medal and travelling scholarship. While still studying at the Royal Academy, Frampton undertook a number of sculpture commissions including, in 1885, pieces for the facade of both the Constitutional Club in Northumberland Avenue and for the Chelsea Conservative Club. He also created an altarpiece for Manchester Cathedral, some decorative pieces for the Henry Fawcett Memorial in London and a pair of terracotta figures representing Concord and Industry which were exhibited in Paris and purchased for the Municipal Building in Christchurch, New Zealand. From 1887 to 1890, he studied and worked at the studio of Antonin Mercie in Paris, where he also studied painting under Pascal Dagnan-Bouveret and Gustave Courtois.

Early works

Frampton returned to England and, briefly, worked in the studio of Sir Joseph Edgar Boehm. He then took up a teaching post at the Slade School of Art in 1893 and was also, for a year, the joint head of the Central School of Arts and Crafts.

In 1893, Frampton married the artist Christabel Cockerell and the couple set up home together at St John's Wood in London. Together they designed a decorative frieze for the interior of the house and Frampton began to design household fittings, jewellery in enamel and precious metals and also medals, most notably for Glasgow University and Winchester College. By this time, Frampton was, according to the critic M.H. Spielmann "in open rebellion against white sculpture". In 1893, he showed Mysteriarch, a polychromatic plaster bust with Symbolism motifs at the Royal Academy and, two years later he showed another polychromatic work, Mother and Child at the same venue. Mother and Child has bronze figures, of Frampton's wife and son, set against a copper plaque, and a white enamel disc behind the mother's head. 

In his statue of Dame Alice Owen (1897) Frampton combined bronze, alabaster, gilding and marble, and, later, with the bust Lamia (1899-1900) he contrasted an ivory head and neck with bronze clothing inlaid with opals. The statue of Dame Alice Owen was originally shown at the Royal Academy as a free-standing statue but when it was installed in the entry hall of Owen's School Frampton made it the centre of a larger installation that he designed. In panels and niches around the statue, which he placed on a pink marble pedestal, Frampton included 16th-century carvings of Owen's ancestors and fragments of her 17th-century tomb.

In 1896, Frampton exhibited, with the architect Charles Harrison Townsend, a large fireplace in American walnut at the Arts and Crafts Exhibition Society. The fireplace was decorated with an innovative tree and foliage design by Frampton that was subsequently much imitated by Art Nouveau and Arts and Crafts designers and became known as the "Frampton tree". Frampton used a similar design in his 1897 memorial to Charles Mitchell for St George's Church in Jesmond in Newcastle upon Tyne.

Recognition

Frampton's body of work in the 1880s brought him considerable recognition. The University of St Andrews awarded him an honorary doctorate in 1894. In 1897, examples of Frampton's work featured at the Venice Biennale and at the Vienna Secession the following year. He regularly exhibited at the La Libre Esthétique in Brussels, a city he considered an important market for his work. For the four pieces he showed at the Paris International Exhibition in 1900, Frampton was awarded the Grand Prix. Those works included My Thoughts Are My Children, 1894, a large polychromic relief in bronze in a wooden frame depicting a woman holding a lily surrounded by drapery under a second female figure holding an infant and two children in front of a symbol of a rising sun. The work appears to have had a special significance to Frampton as he frequently chose it to represent his work at other major international exhibitions and kept the piece in his possession throughout his life. The work passed to his son, Meredith Frampton, who eventually donated it to the Walker Art Gallery in Liverpool.

Recognition also brought Frampton two significant public commissions at this time. The architect John William Simpson appointed Frampton as master sculptor for the decoration of the facade of the Kelvingrove Art Gallery and Museum in Glasgow. As well as overseeing the work of several other sculptors, Frampton created a bronze sculpture group and three sets of stone spandrels for the north porch of the new building. The sculpture group, of St Mungo attended by the muses of Art and Music, in the central arch of the porch contains Symbolism style motiffs featuring trees, bells and fishes similar to those Frampron had used in some of his earlier smaller pieces. Frampton's other commission was for a frieze on the facade of the Lloyd's Register building in Fenchurch Street in London. There, Frampton created, at first floor level, a frieze in Portland stone of female figures representing Trade, Commerce and Shipping with four bronze statuettes at key points. Both commissions, but especially the Fenchurch Street frieze, were widely praised at the time.

Later career
In April 1897, a public meeting in Calcutta (now Kolkata) agreed to raise funds to mark the Diamond Jubilee of Queen Victoria and, eventually, commissioned Frampton to create a statue of the monarch. Photographs of Frampton's model for the statue were published in the July 1898 edition of The Studio. The accompanying text described a figure over twice life-size, seated under a canopy, wearing the robe of the Order of the Star of India, decorated in gold, ivory and lapis lazuli. A polychrome plaster version was displayed at the Glasgow Exhibition of 1901 and was greatly praised for its depiction of the elderly queen. The completed statue was shipped to India early in 1901 and erected on a temporary site in March 1902. Although the statue sent to India was considerably less ornate and lacked the canopy of the original proposal, Frampton's completed work included two putti in a New Sculpture style above the back of the throne plus two miniature infantrymen on the pedestal and a small figure of St George held by the Queen. The statue was subsequently moved to a location in front of the Victoria Memorial, where it was sited on a large architectural podium. Lord Curzon, the driving force behind the Memorial project, came to dislike Frampton's depiction of an elderly and vulnerable Victoria and commissioned Thomas Brock to create a second statue, in marble, of a younger Queen to be placed in the central hall of the completed building.

The death of Queen Victoria in January 1901 led to Frampton receiving several commissions for memorials to the Queen. Frampton based several of these on his design of a seated figure he used for the Kolkata statue but with some variations. He used the same cast for the statues in Leeds and St Helens but changed the style of the decorative details and pedestals between them. A further version was created for the grounds of the Manitoba Legislative Building in Winnipeg in 1904. A different design of a much younger, standing Victoria was created for the Royal Victoria Infirmary in Newcastle upon Tyne in 1906 and was unveiled by her son King Edward VII in the same year.

Among Frampton's other notable public sculptures are the figures of Peter Pan playing a set of pipes, the lions at the British Museum and the Edith Cavell Memorial that stands outside the National Portrait Gallery, London. 

Frampton's original statue of Peter Pan in Kensington Gardens, London, was commissioned by J.M. Barrie in 1912. Barrie was said to be disappointed at Frampton's depiction of Peter Pan, in particular at his choice of model for the figure of the boy. However such was the popularity of the statue, six more casts were made which are now situated in:
 Perth, Western Australia, Australia
 Parc d'Egmont, Brussels, Belgium
 Bowring Park, St. John's, Newfoundland, Canada
 Toronto, Canada
 Sefton Park, Liverpool, England
 Camden, New Jersey, United States.

By March 1905, Aston Webb, the architect of the Cromwell Road extension to the Victoria and Albert Museum had commissioned over twenty sculptors to provide statues, carvings and decorations for the facade of the building. Webb allocated what he considered the two most important areas to Frampton and Alfred Drury. The area over the main entrance arch was allocated to Frampton who created spandrel figures of Truth and Beauty for the space while the remainder of the main entrance was assigned to Drury.

A number of Frampton's works can be seen at the restored St James' Church, Warter in East Yorkshire. Frampton created Dr Barnardo's Memorial, in Barkingside, London, in 1908, a work he undertook without claiming a fee.

During World War I Frampton used his position in various art societies and institutions to expel any German members he considered potential "enemy aliens". When the Art Workers Guild refused to expel Karl Krall, a British citizen born in Germany, Frampton resigned from the Guild. In 1915, Frampton was commissioned to create a public memorial to Edith Cavell. Having waived his fee for the work, Frampton's modernist style monument in marble and granite was unveiled to huge crowds near Trafalgar Square in central London during 1920. The severe, modern appearance of the memorial is distinct from Frampton's earlier, more heroic style of Boer War memorials and was criticised as such. Several contemporary sculptors also criticised the design and the engineering of the monument.

Frampton subsequently worked with Sir Edwin Lutyens on two of the architect's war memorials in the aftermath of the First World War, the Hove War Memorial in East Sussex and the Fordham War Memorial in Cambridgeshire, unveiled in February and August 1921 respectively. Both feature a bronze statue of Saint George, sculpted by Frampton atop a column designed by Lutyens.

Personal life
Frampton's first house and studio was at 32 Queen's Grove (where a blue plaque to his name has been erected), but he later built a larger house nearby in Carlton Hill, both in St John's Wood, London. He was married to the artist Christabel Cockerell and had one son, the painter and etcher Meredith Frampton. 

Frampton, like several of his contemporaries, referred to himself as an "art worker" rather than an artist or sculptor and championed the equality of artistic work with craft or decorative practices. He was an active member of The Art Workers' Guild and became Master in 1902. He sculpted the Art Workers' Guild's Master's Jewel in silver representing 'Art is Unity'. Frampton became a royal academician in 1902 and was knighted in 1908.

Death
Frampton died on 21 May 1928 aged 67 and was cremated at Golders Green Crematorium on 25 May. His ashes lie in a niche on the ground floor of the east wing of the Ernest George Columbarium. A memorial sculpted by Ernest Gillick in 1930 depicting a bronze child holding a miniature copy of Frampton's statue of Peter Pan is located in the Crypt of St. Paul's Cathedral.

Public monuments

1887–1904

1905–1909

1910–1919

1920 and later

Other works, United Kingdom
 Marble statue of Queen Mary, Guildhall Art Gallery, London
 Sandstone reliefs for 177 Ingram St, Glasgow, 1896–1900

 Stone spandrel reliefs for Electra House, Moorgate c.1902
 Kelvingrove Art Gallery and Museum, stone spandrels on the north porch entrance, main face British Colonies saluting the Arms of Glasgow, side returns Love teaching Harmony to the Arts and The Industries of Glasgow at the Court of Mercury
 Figure of  Bishop George Wilkinson in St Ninian's Cathedral, Perth.
 Bronze bust of Francis Galton at University College London
 A bust of Richard Garnett which was shown at the Royal Academy in 1899.
 A 1908 bust of Robert Herbert in the Foreign Office, London.
 Bust of Frederick Inderwick in the Royal Courts of Justice in London.
 Frampton cooperated with Alfred East and Thomas Cooper Gotch to create a memorial tablet to the artist John Trivett Nettleship for a church in Kettering.
 An original bust, and several copies, of John Passmore Edwards.
 Head & shoulders in high relief of Dr Barnardo at Barnardo's Home in Barkingside, 1908.
 Statuette of St George, a memorial to pilot Lieutenant Francis Mond who was killed in action on 15 May 1918.
 Monument to Charles William Mitchell, Church of St George, Jesmond, Newcastle upon Tyne, 1903-1905
 Marble recumbent effigy of Lady Isobel Wilson, died 1905, in St James' Church, Warter, Yorkshire
 Monument, with portrait bust, to Sir George Williams, 1908, the crypt of St Paul's Cathedral, London
 Monument, with portrait medallion and statue of St George, to Edward VII, King Edward's Hospital, Northampton, c. 1910

Other works, India
 Marble statue of Queen Mary, 1910, interior of the Victoria Memorial, Kolkata 
 Marble statue of Queen Mary, c. 1918, installed 1930 in the Marble Hall of Rashtrapati Bhavan, New Delhi;- now the official residence of the President of India
 Marble bust, 1914, of Queen Mary for the entrance for Queen Mary's College for Women, Mylapore, Chennai
 Bronze, equestrian statue of Sir John Woodburn, Lieutenant Governor of Bengal, erected 1907 in Kolkata, later relocated to Barrackpore
 Bronze statue on a pedestal of Andrew Henderson Leith Fraser, 1911, gardens of Victoria Memorial, Kolkata
 Bronze statue of Queen Victoria, c. 1899, now in the Uttar Pradesh State Museum, Lucknow
 Marble statue of Antony MacDonnell, 1st Baron MacDonnell, 1905, erected 1907 at Lucknow, India and now in the Uttar Pradesh State Museum, Lucknow

References

External links

 
 Sir George Frampton RA Collection

1860 births
1928 deaths
19th-century English sculptors
20th-century English sculptors
19th-century English male artists
20th-century English male artists
Alumni of the City and Guilds of London Art School
Alumni of the Royal Academy Schools
British architectural sculptors
English male sculptors
Golders Green Crematorium
Knights Bachelor
Masters of the Art Worker's Guild
Recipients of the Order of Leopold II
Royal Academicians
Sculptors from London